Afaq Hussain (31 December 1939 – 25 February 2002) was a Pakistani cricketer who played in two Tests from 1961 to 1964.

Afaq Hussain holds a unique record in Test cricket, having scored the most Test runs (66) without being dismissed. He scored 10* and 35* against England at Lahore in October 1961, and 8* and 13* against Australia at Melbourne in December 1964.

He toured England with the Pakistan team in 1962, and again in 1963 with the Pakistan Eaglets, and was part of the Pakistan team that toured Australia and New Zealand in 1964–65.

An "quickish" off-spin bowler and useful lower-order batsman, Hussain played for various first-class teams in Pakistan between 1957 and 1974. His best bowling figures were 8 for 108 for Karachi University against a combined Railways and Quetta side in 1960–61. His highest score was 122 not out for Pakistan International Airlines against Lahore B in 1969–70.

References

External links
 Afaq Hussain at CricketArchive
 

1939 births
2002 deaths
Pakistan Test cricketers
Muhajir people
Pakistani cricketers
Pakistan Eaglets cricketers
Karachi B cricketers
Karachi A cricketers
Karachi University cricketers
Karachi Blues cricketers
Karachi Whites cricketers
Karachi cricketers
Pakistan International Airlines cricketers
Pakistan Universities cricketers
Public Works Department cricketers
Pakistan International Airlines A cricketers
Cricketers from Lucknow